UAM-Azcapotzalco (formerly Azcapotzalco) is a metro station in northern Mexico City, located in the Azcapotzalco borough, along Line 6. In 2019, the station had an average ridership of 8,076 passengers per day.

General information
Azcapotzalco was opened on 23 December 1983, as part of the first stretch of Line 6, Line 6, going from El Rosario to Instituto del Petróleo.

The station serves the Reynosa Tamaulipas, San Andrés and San Marcos neighborhoods. It is also close to Azcapotzalco's downtown and city hall as well as to the Universidad Autónoma Metropolitana Azcapotzalco campus.

Name and pictogram
The station was originally named Azcapotzalco. This was decided due to the fact that Metro Azcapotzalco was the closest station to downtown Azcapotzalco and to the municipality's city hall.

The station's pictogram depict an ant because Azcapotzalco's ancient meaning literally translates to "in the place of the anthills".

Ridership

References

External links

Uam-Azcapotzalco
Railway stations opened in 1983
1983 establishments in Mexico
Mexico City Metro stations in Azcapotzalco
Railway stations in Mexico at university and college campuses